{{DISPLAYTITLE:2011 XC2}}

From mid October 2011 until 3 December 2011 15:00 UT the small dim asteroid had an elongation less than 60 degrees from the Sun. (While less than 18 degrees from the Sun any dim asteroid can be lost in astronomical twilight, and many observatories can not see below ~40 degrees from the horizon.) On 3 December 2011 at 15:20 UT the asteroid passed  from Earth and at 16:20 UT passed  from the Moon. The asteroid was then discovered on 8 December 2011 by Lincoln Near-Earth Asteroid Research (LINEAR) at an apparent magnitude of 19 using a  reflecting telescope. At the time of discovery the asteroid was near opposition to the Sun.

It has an observation arc of 22 days with an uncertainty parameter of 7. Virtual clones of the asteroid that fit the uncertainty region in the known trajectory show a 1 in 455,000 chance that the asteroid will impact Earth on 2 December 2056. Using the nominal orbit, JPL Horizons shows that the asteroid will be  from Earth on 2 December 2056.

References

External links 
 
 
 

Minor planet object articles (unnumbered)

20111203
20111208